Mohammed VII may refer to:

 Muhammed VII, Sultan of Granada (1370–1408) 
 Muhammad VII of Bornu (1731–1747) of the Sayfawa dynasty